The World Trade Center Abu Dhabi is a complex of two skyscrapers in Abu Dhabi, United Arab Emirates. Construction of these towers was scheduled to end in 2010, though the 2008 financial crisis pushed the project completion date to 2014. The complex includes two malls, and one Courtyard by Marriott hotel. The complex was initially planned to house three skyscrapers, but the 2008 crisis forced the contractors to withdraw construction of the Hotel Tower, the result being two skyscrapers.

Burj Mohammed bin Rashid 
Burj Mohammed bin Rashid is the tallest building in Abu Dhabi and the skyscraper with the most floors in the city as of its completion in 2014. As of 2022, it is the seventh tallest residential building in the world. The tower is adjacent to the shorter Trust Tower offices.

The Trust Tower
The office tower, called the "Trust Tower", rises  and has 60 floors, completed in Q2 of 2012. The tower was publicly opened in 2013, and houses leased properties, and the offices of the World Trade Centers Association. It is connected to a Courtyard by Marriott via a large mall and a souk, both operated by the World Trade Center.

The Hotel Tower
Its plans for construction were scrapped soon after the 2008 crisis.

See also
 List of tallest buildings in Abu Dhabi
 List of tallest buildings in the United Arab Emirates

References

Mixed-use developments in the United Arab Emirates
Residential skyscrapers in Abu Dhabi
Skyscraper office buildings in Abu Dhabi
Skyscraper hotels in Abu Dhabi
2014 establishments in the United Arab Emirates